The 2001 Formula Chrysler Euroseries season was the inaugural and only Formula Chrysler Euroseries season. It featured seven races at four European racing circuits during the latter half of 2001. Dutchman Ricardo van der Ende was crowned champion of the series, taking four wins in all and beating Mexican Roberto González to the title.

Teams and drivers

Race calendar and results

Championship standings

Drivers

Teams

References

External links
driverdb.com Formula Chrysler Euroseries 2001
speedsport-magazine.com Formula Chrysler Euroseries
motorsport-archive.com Formula Chrysler Euroseries

Formula Chrysler Euroseries
Formula Chrysler Euroseries